Cruzeño, also known as Isleño (Ysleño) or Island Chumash, was one of the Chumashan languages spoken along the coastal areas of Southern California. It shows evidence of mixing between a core Chumashan language such as Barbareño or Ventureño and an indigenous language of the Channel Islands. The latter was presumably spoken on the islands since the end of the last ice age separated them from the mainland; Chumash would have been introduced in the first millennium after the introduction of plank canoes on the mainland. Evidence of the substratum language is retained in a noticeably non-Chumash phonology, and basic non-Chumash words such as those for 'water' and 'house'.

References

 Heizer R. F., ed. 1952. California Indian linguistic records: The Mission Indian vocabularies of Alphonse Pinart. University of California Anthropological Records 15:1-84.
 Heizer R. F., ed. 1952.  California Indian linguistic records: The Mission Indian vocabularies of H.W. Henshaw. University of California Anthropological Records 15:85-202.

External links 
Island Chumash language — overview at the Survey of California and Other Indian Languages
Berkeley.edu; California Language Archive: Island Chumash language
OLAC resources about the Cruzeño language

Chumashan languages
Channel Islands of California
Indigenous languages of California
Extinct languages of North America
Languages extinct in the 20th century
History of Santa Barbara County, California
History of Ventura County, California